Abdulrahman Al-Rio (born 15 May 1994) is a Saudi Arabian footballer who plays as a full-back for Al-Faisaly.

Club career
In 2016, Al-Rio was called up to Al-Ittihad's first team. On 20 April 2016, Al-Rio made his senior team debut in the 5th matchday of the AFC Champions League against Sepahan, playing the full 90 minutes by coach Victor Pițurcă. On 14 March 2017, Al-Rio made his Saudi Professional League debut against Al-Batin F.C., replacing Bader Al-Nakhli at the 82nd minute.

On 23 August 2018, Al-Rio joined Al-Hazem until the end of the 2018–19 season. On 6 July 2019, Al-Rio joined Al-Wehda on a free transfer. On 28 September 2020, Al-Rio joined Damac. On 26 January 2022, Al-Rio joined Al-Hazem on loan for the second time. On 9 September 2022, Al-Rio joined Al-Faisaly on a free transfer.

Career statistics

Club

Honours
Al-Ittihad
Saudi Crown Prince Cup: 2016–17
King Cup: 2018

References

1994 births
Living people
Association football defenders
Sportspeople from Jeddah
Saudi Arabian footballers
Saudi Arabia youth international footballers
Ittihad FC players
Al-Hazem F.C. players
Al-Wehda Club (Mecca) players
Damac FC players
Al-Faisaly FC players
Saudi Professional League players
Saudi First Division League players
Footballers at the 2014 Asian Games
Asian Games competitors for Saudi Arabia
21st-century Saudi Arabian people
20th-century Saudi Arabian people